Edward Musgrave Blaiklock  (6 July 1903 – 26 October 1983) was chair of classics at the University of Auckland from 1947 to 1968, and champion of Christian apologetic literature in New Zealand from the 1950s until his death in 1983.

Biography

Childhood
Edward Musgrave Blaiklock was born on 6 July 1903 in Birmingham, England, to Edward Blaiklock and Florence Blaiklock (née Tromans).  In 1909 the family emigrated to Auckland, New Zealand, and the next year they purchased a  farm on the outskirts of Titirangi.  Blaiklock received his primary education at Avondale Side School and New Lynn School, and his secondary education at Auckland Grammar School.

Teaching
Blaiklock was accepted by the Auckland Education Board as a pupil-teacher and taught at Avondale School for a year, then spent 1921 and 1922 at Auckland Training College.  He also spent this time studying for a BA degree at Auckland University College. In 1921 Blaiklock attended an evangelistic meeting at Auckland Baptist Tabernacle in Queen Street where he heard Joseph Kemp preach, and became a Christian as a result. In 1923 Blaiklock was appointed as a teacher at Mount Albert School.  He completed his BA in 1924, and was appointed to teach languages at Mount Albert Grammar School in 1925.  While there he introduced soccer to the school and inaugurated a secondary schools soccer competition.

Classics and lectureship
Continuing his studies at Auckland University, Blaiklock completed an MA degree in Latin and French with first-class honours in 1925, and also a second first-class honours degree in Latin.  He attracted the attention of Classics professor A. C. Paterson who, unlike his predecessor H. S. Dettman, encouraged Blaiklock's interest in the study of Greek, and granted him a lectureship in Classics in November 1926. Blaiklock gave his first lecture in March 1927 and over the next few years taught courses in Latin and Greek at all levels. He married Kathleen Minnie Mitchell at the Baptist Tabernacle on 13 November 1928.  Edward and Kathleen went on to have two sons.

Classics chair A. C. Paterson died suddenly in 1933, and although Paterson had been grooming Blaiklock as his successor, the university preferred instead to appoint Charles Cooper.  A deep divide developed between the two scholars, and in 1940 Blaiklock was made directly responsible for teaching Greek, with Cooper responsible for Latin.  During this time Blaiklock published The male characters of Euripides, for which the University of New Zealand awarded him the degree of LittD in 1946.  In 1945 he and his family moved to Titirangi, where Blaiklock and his wife resided for the remainder of their lives.

Chair of classics and leading Christian apologist
In 1941, Blaiklock was invited to write as a columnist for the Weekly News by editor H. I. Macpherson.  When the Weekly News was retired Blaiklock continued in the Sunday Herald, and then the New Zealand Herald. His column went under the name "Grammaticus".  In 1947, upon the sudden resignation of Charles Cooper, Blaiklock was appointed to the chair of Classics.  He went on to hold the office of public orator, and was a member of the New Zealand Literary Fund Advisory Committee from 1958 to 1964.

During the 1960s and 1970s Blaiklock produced a large volume of literature in the fields of biblical studies and Christian apologetics.  He was regarded by many as New Zealand's own champion of traditional Christian belief against the swell of modernist and liberal theology occurring at that time. In 1968 he published  Layman's Answer: An examination of the new theology, an answer to the claims of Lloyd Geering. The same year he retired from his university chair, but continued to write for evangelical organisations such as Scripture Union.  He worked with his son David A. Blaiklock to produce Is It, or Isn't It?: Why We Believe in the Existence of God. E. M. Blaiklock served as president of the Baptist Union of New Zealand in 1971, and in 1974 was awarded an OBE for 'services to scholarship and the community'.  He also found work as a guide for tour parties to the biblical lands of the Middle East, Greece and Italy.

Newspaper columnist
Known to many thousands as Grammaticus, his articles appeared for more than 40 years, without missing a week, in the defunct Weekly News and the Sunday Herald and, after April 1975, in the New Zealand Herald.

Death
Blaiklock's wife Kathleen died in February 1978, which affected him deeply.  He continued for a time to lead tour parties overseas, but a few years later became a victim of cancer, and died on 26 October 1983.

Obituary
The Dictionary of New Zealand Biography gives Blaiklock the following description:

As a lecturer in Classics and as a lay preacher, Blaiklock…established himself as a natural communicator who could build a close rapport with an audience, carrying them along on the current of his own enthusiasm. He was helped in this by a handsome countenance, an athletic build, a strong, clear voice, and a commanding presence, backed up by a fluent command of English and a wide reading in his own and related fields.

Works

Books

—UK edition

 published as In the Image of Peter, Moody, 1969.

 - Blaiklock under pseudonym "Grammaticus"

 - Blaiklock under pseudonym "Grammaticus"

 - reissue of the title The Young Man Mark
 - Reissue in the UK of Is It, or Isn't It?: Why We Believe in the Existence of God

 

 - reprint of Blaiklock's Handbook to the Bible
 - reprint of The World of the New Testament

Chapters

Articles

Translator
(Translator) Thomas a Kempis, The Imitation of Christ, Thomas Nelson, 1980.
(Translator) Thomas a Kempis, Brother Lawrence, Thomas Nelson, 1982.
(Translator) The Practice of the Presence of God: Based on the Conversations, Letters, Ways, and Spiritual Principles of Brother Lawrence, as well as on the Writings of Joseph de Beaufort, Thomas Nelson, 1982.
(Translator) The Confessions of Saint Augustine: A New Translation with Introductions, Thomas Nelson, 1983.
(Translator with C.C. Keys) The Little Flowers of Saint Frances: The Acts of Saint Francis and His Companions, Servant Books, 1985.

Also author of monographs on classical and religious subjects; archaeological editor of Pictorial Encyclopedia of the Bible, Zondervan. Columnist, under pseudonym Grammaticus, in Auckland Weekly News, 1942–. Contributor of editorials, articles, and reviews to classical journals in United States and United Kingdom and to New Zealand newspapers.

Bibliography

References

Dictionary of New Zealand Biography Edward Musgrave Blaiklock

1903 births
1983 deaths
Baptist writers
People educated at Auckland Grammar School
Hellenists
Lay theologians
Religious leaders from Auckland
New Zealand classical scholars
New Zealand evangelical leaders
Academic staff of the University of Auckland
People from Birmingham, West Midlands
University of Auckland alumni
New Zealand Baptists
New Zealand biblical scholars
New Zealand Officers of the Order of the British Empire
English emigrants to New Zealand
Oceanian biblical scholars
20th-century Baptists